Montenegro Airlines a.d. was the flag carrier of Montenegro, headquartered in Podgorica. It operated scheduled and charter services throughout Europe from its hub at Podgorica Airport with a second base maintained at Tivat Airport. The airline was liquidated from 26 December 2020 due to accumulating heavy losses during the COVID-19 pandemic.

In February 2021, the government of Montenegro launched a new flag carrier, Air Montenegro.

History

Early years
The airline was founded on 24 October 1994, by the government of the Federal Republic of Yugoslavia. The first aircraft, a Fokker 28 Mk4000 (nicknamed "Lovćen"), was purchased almost two years later in 1996. The first commercial flight took place on 7 May 1997, at exactly 10:30 between Podgorica and Bari, Italy.

In April 2000, Montenegro Airlines became a member of the International Air Transport Association (IATA). In June 2000, the first of five Fokker 100 aircraft was delivered to Podgorica Airport. The airline joined Amadeus CRS on 5 March 2003. In 2004, Montenegro Airlines' pilots were the first in the region to be granted the IIIA certificate. On 2 July of the same year, the airline carried its millionth passenger.

After the Montenegrin independence referendum, Serbia became an international market for Montenegrin companies. Montenegro Airlines had to cease international flights from Serbia to countries other than Montenegro, thus losing the profitable Niš - Zurich line, due to lack of Seventh Freedom policy. In an effort to circumvent this, Montenegro Airlines registered a separate airline in Serbia called Master Airways, but it was denied an operating license allegedly due to Serbian Government protectionist policies.
On 23 July 2007, Montenegro Airlines ordered 2 Embraer 195 in order to grow its fleet and destination network. The aircraft being leased from GECAS for a period of 8 years. The first of the two Embraer E-195s arrived at Podgorica Airport on 5 June 2008. The delivery of the first Embraer was followed by introduction of regular flights to London-Gatwick and Milan-Malpensa International Airport.

On 17 April 2009, El Al and Montenegro Airlines issued a joint statement reiterating El Al's keen interest in buying 30% of the stock, but the plan failed. The airline remains a government-owned company and enjoys financial and protectionist support from the government.

Development since 2010
After the arrival of the airline's first pair of Embraer E-195s, Montenegro Airlines requested Embraer to change the remaining backlog order to the E-175. However, the third E-195 was delivered anyway, and thus the fourth remaining order was to be an E-175. On 6 July 2012, local media cited that Montenegro Airlines has yet again changed the fourth order, this time requesting an E-190LR model. The aircraft was delivered in May 2014. In November 2014, Montenegro Airlines put both its Fokker 100s up for sale. However, by June 2015 no buyer has been found and the aircraft are likely to be scrapped.

Liquidation and the new company
In August 2016, it was reported that accounts belonging to Montenegro Airlines had been frozen after the airline failed to comply with a court ruling regarding the payment of debts to the operator of the country's airports. Montenegro Airlines owed the company more than US$15 million.

In December 2020, the Government of Montenegro announced the shutdown and liquidation of the company in the forthcoming weeks stating mismanagement and accumulating losses for several years. Shortly after, it has been announced that the airline will suspend all flights from 26 December 2020 marking the end of its operations.

On 29 December 2020, it was announced by Minister Mladen Bojanić that the Montenegro Airlines would be reorganized and replaced with a new company the To Montenegro (2 Montenegro), as the new Montenegrin flag carrier airline.

In late 2020 it was uncovered that a number of individuals close to the ruling DPS party, such as controversial religious leader Miraš Dedeić, were given free tickets or significant discount for the flights of the Montenegro Airlines.

In April 2021, it was reported the Montenegrin government made  Air Montenegro the official name for the ToMontenegro project and that the airline would start up using two of Montenegro Airlines' former Embraer-195 aircraft.

In June 2021, Montenegro Airlines' former directors, pilots, flight crew and other employees reported to the Bankruptcy Administration claims of US$205 million for salaries, taxes, contributions, per diems and fees.

Corporate affairs

Business trends 
The available business and operating results of Montenegro Airlines are (as at year ending 31 December):

Destinations

At the time of closure, Montenegro Airlines served 18 destinations in Denmark, France, Germany, Italy, Russia, Austria, Slovenia, Serbia, Switzerland and the United Kingdom.

Codeshare agreements
Montenegro Airlines maintained codeshare agreements with the following airlines:
Air Serbia
Etihad Airways
S7 Airlines

Fleet

Final fleet
At the time of closure, Montenegro Airlines fleet consisted of the following aircraft:

Historical fleet
The airline previously operated the following aircraft:

Incidents and accidents
On 25 January 2005 at about 11 p.m., a Montenegro Airlines Fokker 100 (YU-AOM) ran off the side of the runway during a night landing in snowy conditions at Podgorica. The nosegear collapsed and the airplane skidded for about 700 meters before coming to rest. Two passengers, the pilot, and the co-pilot sustained minor injuries.
On 7 January 2008, at about 9:30 pm, a Montenegro Airlines Fokker 100 (4O-AOK) was shot at while landing at Podgorica Airport. A routine inspection of the aircraft led to the discovery of a bullet hole in the aircraft's tail. The aircraft was carrying 20 passengers, but no one was injured. The reason for the incident is unknown; however, reports indicate that it may have been an inadvertent result of guns being fired during celebrations for Orthodox Christmas.

References

External links

Official website

Defunct airlines of Montenegro
Airlines established in 1994
Airlines disestablished in 2020
Association of European Airlines
European Regions Airline Association
1994 establishments in Yugoslavia
2020 disestablishments in Montenegro
Montenegrin brands
Companies based in Podgorica